Charlton Kenneth Jeffrey Howard (born 17 August 2003), known professionally as the Kid Laroi (stylised as the Kid LAROI), is an Australian rapper, singer and songwriter. He originally gained recognition from his association and friendship with American rapper Juice Wrld while he was on tour in Australia. He gained a local following before joining a partnership agreement with Lil Bibby's Grade A Productions and Columbia Records, and attained mainstream popularity in 2021 with his collaboration with Justin Bieber on "Stay", which peaked at number 1 on the Billboard Hot 100.

His debut mixtape, F*ck Love (2020), peaked at number one on the Australian ARIA Charts, making him the youngest Australian solo artist ever to reach the top of the chart, and also reached number one on the US Billboard 200. Additionally, Howard's songs "Without You" and its remix with Miley Cyrus, and his collaboration with Justin Bieber, "Stay", reached the top ten of the Billboard Hot 100, with "Stay" peaking at number one for seven non-consecutive weeks. 
Laroi also claims that he does not have a single genre and he enjoys making both rap and pop music.

Early life
Howard was born on 17 August 2003 in Waterloo, New South Wales, in the inner south of Sydney. He has one brother Austin Howard. His father, Nick Howard, is a music producer and sound engineer who has worked with Australian stars such as Bardot and Delta Goodrem. His mother, Sloane Howard, was a talent manager, record label founder and music executive of Aboriginal descent who once managed Popstars winner Scott Cain.

Howard's maternal great-great grandfather was a part of the Stolen Generation of children of mixed Aboriginal descent; through this ancestor he is a Gamilaraay (or Kamilaroi) man, from which he derived his artistic name "Laroi".

Howard's father was not a consistent force in his life and his uncle became his father figure as a result. In 2015, Howard's uncle was murdered. Howard attributes his inspiration to succeed to avoid a fate like his uncle and make him proud. When Howard's parents separated when he was four, his childhood became more chaotic. Howard said that sometimes his mother sold drugs to get by. At the age of seven he moved to the rural town of Broken Hill in New South Wales and lived with his mother, brother and grandparents at the time. He attended a private school, Sacred Heart Parish School, where he was a house captain and won a speaking award. After leaving Broken Hill, Howard attended another private school, Sacred Heart College in Adelaide, for a period of time until he was bullied and his mother could not afford it anymore; they moved back to Sydney in 2017.

In Sydney, Howard attended the Australian Performing Arts Grammar School on a scholarship, but he dropped out midway through year nine to pursue his international career. During this period, his family lived in a Housing Commission  building in Redfern and he drifted between friends' houses. In a 2021 interview, he explained that his mother is his best friend and he wanted to help her through their tough financial situation, so he found a part-time job at a fruit store.

In 2019, hip-hop podcast No Jumper filmed a documentary of Howard and his friends in Redfern as they describe the area as a "ghetto". Howard detailed how he hustled to make it big outside of Australia by building international relationships and stated "I would go and wait outside hotel rooms for big artists that were coming to town. I'd try to play my music and find different ways to meet them or get backstage". His tactics paid off when he sent a female friend on a mission to play his music to Swae Lee in a hotel. It worked: he met and later collaborated with Swae Lee.

Career

Early years
Howard started out recording raps over beats on his mother's phone and uploading them to SoundCloud. In an interview with Triple J, Howard stated that the first rap name he gave himself was "FC6". In 2015, Howard formed the duo "Dream$Team" with Adelaide rapper DJ Marcus Jr. (aka LadyKiller) who became his mentor and support. The two recorded songs together and performed to local audiences as DJ Marcus Jr. guided him through promoting, recording and developing buzz.

Howard met his now collaborator, producer Khaled Rohaim, at a recording studio in Sydney. Moved by Howard's talent and difficult living situation, Rohaim would pick Howard up from various houses that he would live in around Sydney so they could eat together and record at his rented studio in North Strathfield. Rohaim gave Howard some work writing songs for other artists. In one instance, he wrote a song that featured A Boogie and Howard snuck into the studio so he could meet him, eventually recording a song together.

In 2017, Howard was signed to a development deal with Sony Music Australia. In the same year he was a co-host at the Fernside Festival hosted by Weave Youth and Community Services.

2018–2020: 14 with a Dream  
On 16 August 2018, Howard released his debut EP, 14 with a Dream where he collaborated with Manu Crooks, B Wise and Miracle. The same month he garnered attention after becoming a finalist in the Triple J Unearthed high competition. His Triple J Unearthed profile bio simply states "14 with a dream..." and still features three songs that he uploaded; "Disconnect (demo)", "In My Feelings" and "Blessings". In the same year he jumped on stage with Manu Crook$ at Listen Out Festival, rapped with Tkay Maidza at Triple J's One Night Stand Festival, played at Newtown Festival and supported THEY. He collaborated on a song with Lil Skies who posted out a teaser to his over 3 million Instagram fans. Howard was interviewed by community station FBi Radio and presenter Darren Lesaguis stated that the interview had to be after 5pm so Howard could attend after school and he arrived in his school uniform. Howard's drive and confidence to one day be seen as a peer amongst his idols was noted in an interview with Acclaim where he was asked if he could name three Australian acts who he thought were going to be future legends and he stated "...I’d have to say… Can it be me? Can I pick myself? I hate to be that guy, but I definitely hope that I’m a legend."

In March 2019, Howard did an in-store meet and greet for streetwear brand Street X in Darlinghurst where local fans queued to meet him where he also performed alongside Triple One. In the same year he created a partnership agreement with American rapper Lil Bibby's record label Grade A Productions and Columbia Records. Howard was mentored by late rapper Juice Wrld while he supported him on his Australian national tours in 2018 and 2019. Howard lived with Juice Wrld in Los Angeles to learn from his idol how the studio and recording process worked. He performed at Rolling Loud Festivals in Miami and New York. In December, Howard gained international attention when the music video for his song "Let Her Go" was uploaded on the Lyrical Lemonade YouTube channel.

2020–2021: F*ck Love mixtape, reissues 
On 31 January 2020, Howard released "Diva" featuring American rapper Lil Tecca which was accompanied by a Lyrical Lemonade music video directed by Cole Bennett that was released on 1 February. On 22 March, he released "Addison Rae", a song named after the social media personality star of the same name. On 27 March, Howard made a cameo appearance in American rapper Lil Mosey's music video for "Blueberry Faygo". On 17 April, he released "Fade Away" with American rapper Lil Tjay. On 25 April, he was featured on "Go Dumb" by record producer Y2K also featuring Blackbear, and Bankrol Hayden. On 12 June, he released "Go" featuring late American rapper Juice Wrld, which was accompanied by a music video directed by Steve Cannon. On 26 June, Howard was featured on Bankrol Hayden's debut studio album Pain is Temporary, on a remix of "Costa Rica". On 18 July, he released "Tell Me Why", a tribute track to Juice Wrld. Howard revealed the cover art and release date of his mixtape F*ck Love on Twitter the same day. The mixtape was released on 24 July and contains features from Lil Mosey, Corbin, and Juice Wrld. The same day, he released the music video for "Not Fair" featuring Corbin. On 7 August, he released the music video for the song "Selfish". On 28 August, Howard was featured on Internet Money's collective mixtape B4 the Storm on the song "Speak". On 18 September, the music video for "Wrong" directed by Logan Paul featuring Lil Mosey also starring ex-pornstar Lana Rhoades, was released. On 23 October, Howard released his then unknown next project's lead single "So Done" which was accompanied by a Lyrical Lemonade music video directed by Cole Bennett. On 30 October, Howard was featured on "My City" by Onefour.

On 2 November, Howard revealed the next project's title to be Savage on Instagram, and would be released as a reissue of F*ck Love. It was eventually released four days later on 6 November and peaked at number one on the Australian ARIA charts, as well as number 3 on the US Billboard 200. The same day, the music video for "Always Do" directed by Steve Cannon was released. On 26 November, the music video for "Maybe" was released. On 17 December, Howard released the music video for "Without You", directed by Steve Cannon. On 8 December, he was featured on "Reminds Me Of You", a posthumous song by Juice WRLD. The song samples Kim Petras' song "Reminds Me". On 29 December, he released the music video for "Tragic" featuring YoungBoy Never Broke Again, and Internet Money directed by Steve Cannon.

On 19 March 2021, Howard was featured on Canadian singer Justin Bieber's song, "Unstable", from Bieber's sixth studio album Justice. On 30 April, Howard released a remix of "Without You", a collaboration with American singer Miley Cyrus. The song, which had already become extremely popular on TikTok, went on the peak at number 8 on the Billboard Hot 100, becoming Howard's first top-ten single as a lead artist.  On 8 May, he performed the song in the first musical set with Miley Cyrus on the Saturday Night Live Mothers' Day episode, hosted by Elon Musk, with Miley Cyrus as the musical guest. In June 2021, Howard left Grade A Productions and signed a management deal with Scooter Braun. Also that month, Howard announced that the third and final instalment of the F*ck Love trilogy would be released in July. On 9 July, Howard released the song "Stay", a collaboration with Bieber. The song was accompanied by a music video, and peaked at number 1 on the Hot 100, becoming Howard's highest-charting single in the United States. The song was announced about a week prior to its release. A second deluxe of F*ck Love titled F*ck Love 3: Over You was released on 23 July. The deluxe also featured guest appearances from Polo G, Stunna Gambino, G Herbo, and Lil Durk. The second deluxe was also accompanied by an extended version, titled F*ck Love 3+: Over You, which was released on 27 July with an additional six songs. As a result, the F*ck Love project reached number one on the Billboard 200 over one year after its initial release. Howard and Bieber performed "Stay" at the 2021 VMA awards and was nominated for Best New Artist and Push Performance of the Year, for "Without You". In September 2021, Howard left SB Projects and signed with Adam Leber at Rebel Management. On 24 November 2021, Howard won Best Artist and Best Pop Release at the 2021 ARIA Music Awards, before performing "Stay" to close out the awards show.

2021-2022: End of the World Tour and other ventures
On 13 January 2022, Howard teased a song with Don Toliver while hinting at a new album. On 22 January, "Stay" was voted 2nd in Triple J's 2021 Hottest 100, making him the highest ranking Indigenous artist ever in the annual event. On 22 April, Howard released his first song since "Stay" titled "Thousand Miles", which premiered alongside a music video. The music video reached 1 million views in about a day. In May 2022, Howard exited Adam Leber's Rebel Management and re-signed with Scooter Braun. The same month, Howard returned to Sydney, Australia for the first time since he moved to Los Angeles, United States in 2019, to perform his debut headlining concert tour titled the End of the World Tour, in support of his mixtape, F*ck Love. After Howard fell ill before his Melbourne show at Rod Laver Arena on 3 June, his shows were postponed at late notice and Howard issued an apology to fans while they were rescheduled. On 8 July, Howard and American rapper Fivio Foreign released "Paris to Tokyo" alongside a music video. On 22 July, he was featured on Nardo Wick's song "Burning Up" from the latter's debut studio album, Who Is Nardo Wick?. In December, he performed at iHeartRadio's 2022 Jingle Ball.

2023-present: The First Time and Bleed For You tour 
On 12 January 2023, Howard posted a short trailer on YouTube for his upcoming debut studio album, The First Time. The album is supported by the singles "I Can't Go Back to the Way It Was (Intro)", "Love Again", and "Kids Are Growing Up (Part 1)". On 27 January, Howard hosted a Fortnite concert titled "Wildest Dreams". In February, Howard announced his second headlining tour Bleed For You to support The First Time that will begin 22 March in Syracuse, New York. On 27 February 2023, Howard released a song dedicated to Valentines Day "I Guess It's Love?" alongside a music video featuring his girlfriend Katarina Deme. The end of the music video revealed the next and final song to the album would be "What Just Happened" and would reveal the date of the album.

Other ventures
In May 2022, Howard collaborated with McDonald's in Australia to launch his own McDonald's meal, consisting of 6 chicken nuggets, medium fries, a cheeseburger with no pickles, barbecue sauce, and a frozen Coca-Cola. The same month, Howard donated $100,000 to a youth service he attended when he was younger at Waterloo, New South Wales.

Persona and reception

Style
Fashion has been a big part of Howard's transformation from Redfern resident to international star. Howard explained to Spout Podcast that in Australia he apparently did not have a lot of money and was wearing a lot of sport tracksuits. Since moving to California, Howard's style has switched to high end designers such as Celine, Louis Vuitton, Comme des Garçons and is known for his love of knitted jumpers. Howard has featured in style editorials for magazines such as Flaunt and was on the cover of Wonderland magazine in Autumn 2021.

Accent
Howard's accent and heavy use of American colloquial terms has been questioned since he has only been living there since 2019. In an interview with Zach Sang, he explained that he has many friends from Chicago and to make himself understood he often tweaks phrases and adapts as they do not understand many Australian words.

Awards and nominations

Personal life
As of 2020, Howard lives in Los Angeles with his mother, younger brother, and father, Nick. Howard sees himself as an ambassador for Australia and told Triple J that he wants to do for Australia what Drake did to put Toronto and Canada on the map.

Since 2020, Howard has been in a relationship with social media and TikTok personality Katarina Deme.

In August 2021, Howard noted in an Instagram post that he was recovering from COVID-19 and had been in isolation for a week. The post was live for a short period, before it was edited to remove that information, and Howard tweeted a video in which he stated he was quarantining with his girlfriend as they both had the virus. A later update said that he had fully recovered.

Discography

 The First Time (2023)

Other works

Video game

Tours

Headlining
 The End of the World Tour (2022)
 Bleed For You Tour (2023)

References

External links

 

 
2003 births
Living people
21st-century Australian male singers
ARIA Award winners
Australian child singers
Australian contemporary R&B singers
Australian expatriates in the United States
Australian hip hop musicians
Australian hip hop singers
Australian male rappers
Australian people of French descent
Australian pop singers
Gamilaraay
Indigenous Australian musicians
Emo rap musicians
Pop rock singers
Pop rappers
Columbia Records artists